Ndugu M’Hali or Kalulu ( – 28 March 1877) was an African slave and adopted child of the explorer and journalist Henry Morton Stanley. Kalulu died young, but in his short life he visited Europe, America and the Seychelles. He had a book dedicated to him, a model in Madame Tussauds, and was a guest at David Livingstone's funeral.

Biography
M’Hali was born in Africa and became Henry Morton Stanley's favourite after being given to him at Tabora in Tanzania. M'Hali was freed but was renamed by Stanley. His original name was "Ndugu M’Hali" which meant "My friends brother". Stanley disliked the name, calling him instead "Kalulu," the Swahili word for rabbit.

After Stanley found Dr. Livingstone, he returned to England and decided to take Kalulu with him. He was Stanley's constant companion, and Stanley would record his reactions to new things. He commented on how good he was after drinking wine and upset after trying mustard. Stanley went on a lecture tour to America and to Paris, and Kalulu went with him. At one point they were delayed in the Seychelles, and whilst there and in London, Stanley had his photograph taken with Kalulu in the background. Moreover, Stanley wrote and published a book called "Kalulu, Prince, King and slave" in 1873. The book has been called a homosexual love story, and it describes a growing friendship between a character called Kalulu (an "Apollo"), who is older than the real Kalulu and another boy called "Selim" (Stanley's translator in Africa was called Selim).

Kalulu dined with members of society but often felt he was being humiliated as a result of a previous racist encounter. It was only when introduced to Lord Freeth that he really started to flourish in western society. Stanley said of Kalulu that he had "taken him to England and the United States, and whom I had placed in an English school for eighteen months."

Stanley was sent back to Africa under a mission supported by The Daily Telegraph in London and the New York Herald as an “ambassador of two great powers.” He was to take with him an “army of peace and light,” and this included his protégé Kalulu. Stanley was to map central Africa and report on suspected slave traders whom Stanley had lectured against whilst in England.

M’Hali died in "Kalulu Falls" (part of the Livingstone Falls on the Congo River), when one of the expedition's canoes was taken over the waterfall. He and four others were killed. After learning of the tragedy, Stanley vowed to rid the empire of its only remaining slave master, the one they called 'Marsh'. It was his last request to have the Livingstone Falls renamed after Kalulu. Unlike many new names that Stanley gave to places, the title of Kalulu Falls stuck.

References

1860s births
1877 deaths
Tanzanian children
Servants
Deaths by drowning
Accidental deaths in the Democratic Republic of the Congo
African slaves
Child deaths